The Brownsville Gateway Port of Entry opened in 1926 with the completion of the Gateway International Bridge.  The original bridge was a steel arch design, and arches, which have long been used to signify international gateways, were incorporated into the design of the Matamoros Gateway border station in the 1950s.  Unfortunately, the steel arch bridge was not well maintained, and it was replaced with two flat deck spans in the late 1970s.  All truck traffic has been prohibited since 1999.

References

See also

 List of Mexico–United States border crossings
 List of Canada–United States border crossings

Mexico–United States border crossings
Buildings and structures completed in 1926
1926 establishments in Texas
Buildings and structures in Cameron County, Texas